Christopher Musonda (born January 24, 1986) is a retired Zambian football player. Characterized as a pacy forward, Musonda could also play as a winger.

He was capped for Zambia and played abroad in Finland and Botswana. Musonda and eight other RoPS players got sacked in the spring of 2011 due to match fixing scandal.

References
 
 Guardian Football

1986 births
Living people
Zambian footballers
Zambia international footballers
Zambian expatriate footballers
Expatriate footballers in Finland
Zambian expatriate sportspeople in Finland
Expatriate footballers in Botswana
Zambian expatriate sportspeople in Botswana
Association football forwards
Veikkausliiga players
Forest Rangers F.C.  players
Power Dynamos F.C. players
Rovaniemen Palloseura players
NAPSA Stars F.C. players
Nico United players